Oscar Cervo (born 6 October 1920) was an Argentine sports shooter. He competed at the 1952, 1956, 1960 and 1968 Summer Olympics.

References

External links

1920 births
Possibly living people
Argentine male sport shooters
Olympic shooters of Argentina
Shooters at the 1952 Summer Olympics
Shooters at the 1956 Summer Olympics
Shooters at the 1960 Summer Olympics
Shooters at the 1968 Summer Olympics
Sportspeople from Buenos Aires
Pan American Games gold medalists for Argentina
Pan American Games silver medalists for Argentina
Pan American Games bronze medalists for Argentina
Pan American Games medalists in shooting
Shooters at the 1951 Pan American Games
Shooters at the 1959 Pan American Games
Medalists at the 1951 Pan American Games
20th-century Argentine people